Air Force SC is a Sri Lankan professional football club based in Colombo, that competes in the top tier competition Sri Lanka Champions League. The team is under the patronage of the Sri Lanka Air Force.

Honours
Sri Lanka Football Premier League
Champions (1): 2013

Performance in AFC competitions
 AFC President's Cup: 1 appearance
2014: Group Stage

Squad 2013

References

External links
Football Federation of Sri Lanka
Soccerway statistics

Football clubs in Sri Lanka
Military association football clubs